Mondomarine is a shipyard active in ship building and repairing based in Savona, Italy, focused on designing, engineering and building custom made yachts over 40 meters in aluminium alloy and steel.

See also

 Azimut Yachts
 Baglietto
 Benetti
 Codecasa
 Fincantieri
 Rossinavi
 Sanlorenzo

References

Further reading
 "Mondomarine si aggiudica i Cantieri di Pisa: salvi i 33 dipendenti". La Nazione. 
 "Nautica, Mondomarine Savona si aggiudica i cantieri di Pisa". IVG.  
 di Danilo Renzullo (20 April 2015). "Mondomarine punta i Cantieri di Pisa". il Tirreno.  
 "Nautica, Mondomarine in "corsa" per acquisire i cantieri di Pisa". IVG.  
 "Mondomarine Savona assorbe i 32 lavoratori dei Cantieri di Pisa". IVG. 
 "I Cantieri di Pisa sono salvi: Mondomarine annuncia l’acquisto". il Tirreno. 1 May 2015. 
 "Liguria Nautica News". Liguria Nautica News.

External links 
 Homepage of Mondomarine

Shipbuilding companies of Italy
Shipyards of Italy
Savona